Hosain Sanapour (born 1960) is an Iranian writer.

Biography 

Sanapour earned a degree in natural resources and started to write from his late years in university, sometimes stories, sometimes screenplays and later literary critique and movie reviews. He had been present, since 1990, in Hooshang Golshiri's classes and then sessions, which, allegedly, were effective in his learning of writing techniques.

He has been active in journalism since 1993, writing on literature and arts and in four different newspapers. Prior to that, his articles were published in literary and cinematic publications. He has given lectures on story writing in recent years.

Works and Publications
 Afsane and long night. 
  In 1999, his novel The Absent Half was published by Cheshme publication house. 
 You are coming ruin, was published, and was nominated for a few awards.
 Sanapour also published a collection of articles on novel-writing in 2003.
 In year 2004 he published the story collection titled With open guard 
 In 2005, Dark side of words was published, also by Cheshme publication house.  
 He wrote a story called "Lips on a Blade" that was barred from publication by the government for nearly two years.
 Edge to Edge Persian Edition 
 He also compiled a book on Golshiri titled Hamkhanie Kateban.
 A Home Must Be a Home (Co-authored), 2013
 Perceived Differently (Co-authored), 2013

Awards and Nominations
 Dark side of open words won the 2006 Hooshang Golshiri Literary Award for Best Short Story Collection.
 With open guard was also nominated for several awards, but didn’t win any of them. 
 Mehregan Award (by Peka Institute) and then co-awarded the Yalda Award for his novel The Absent Half''

References

External references
 The Absent Half novel preview
 Interview with The Parsagon Review
 Hossein Sanapour: A brief history of Iran's modern literature- British Council
 List of Hossein Sanapour's publication/books
 Hossein Sanapour at the 7th Hooshang Golshiri Literary Awards Ceremony

Iranian writers
Persian-language writers
Iranian journalists
People from Tehran
1960 births
Living people
Iranian male short story writers
Iranian Writers Association members